Stephanie Hancock (born 9 March 1982) is an Australian rugby league footballer who plays for the Gold Coast Titans in the NRL Women's Premiership.

She previously played for the Brisbane Broncos, winning two premierships in 2018 and 2019.

Background
Born in Killarney, Queensland, Hancock played her junior rugby league for the Eastern Suburbs Hornets in Warwick. 

Her father, Rohan, is a former Queensland and Australian representative. They are the first ever father-daughter pair to represent Queensland and Australia.

Playing career
In 2003, Hancock made her Test debut for Australia at the 2003 Women's Rugby League World Cup. In 2004, she made her debut for Queensland in their win over New South Wales at Suncorp Stadium. Hancock became a regular for both Australia and Queensland over the next 15 years, playing in nine straight wins for Queensland.

In 2008, she played in her second World Cup, with Australia losing 0–34 to New Zealand in the final. On 14 July 2013, Hancock was a member of the Australian side that defeated New Zealand 22–12 in the World Cup final at Headingley Rugby Stadium.

On 7 November 2014, she was named captain of Australia, a position she held until 2017, replacing the retiring Karyn Murphy.

2018
In June, Hancock represented Queensland Country at the inaugural Women's National Championships. On 21 June, she signed with the Brisbane Broncos NRL Women's Premiership team. 

In Round 1 of the 2018 NRL Women's season, Hancock made her debut in the Broncos' 30–4 win over the St George Illawarra Dragons. On 30 September, she came off the bench in the Broncos' 34–12 Grand Final win over the Sydney Roosters.

2019
In May, she represented Queensland Country at the Women's National Championships. On 6 October, she came off the bench in the Broncos' 30–6 Grand Final win over the Dragons.

2020
On 24 September, Hancock joined the St George Illawarra Dragons for the 2020 NRL Women's season.

On 13 November, Hancock scored a try in Queensland's 24–18 State of Origin win over New South Wales. She retired from representative rugby league following the match, her 16th for Queensland.

Achievements and accolades

Individual
QRL Representative Player of the Year: 2013, 2018

Team
2013 Women's Rugby League World Cup: Australia – Winners
2017 Women's Rugby League World Cup: Australia – Winners
2018 NRLW Grand Final: Brisbane Broncos – Winners
2019 NRLW Grand Final: Brisbane Broncos – Winners

References

External links
St George Illawarra Dragons profile

1982 births
Living people
Australian female rugby league players
Australia women's national rugby league team players
Rugby league props
Brisbane Broncos (NRLW) players
St. George Illawarra Dragons (NRLW) players
Rugby league players from Queensland